Paper Dolls is an American primetime television soap opera that aired for 14 episodes on ABC from September 23 to December 25, 1984. Set in New York's fashion industry, the show centered on top modeling agency owner Racine (Morgan Fairchild), her conflicts with the family of cosmetics tycoon Grant Harper (Lloyd Bridges), and the careers of two teenaged models (Terry Farrell and Nicollette Sheridan). The series was based on a 1982 television film of the same name. The show suffered in the ratings, despite positive reviews, and was cancelled midway through the first season.

1982 television film
Prior to the television series, a television film had been made and shown in 1982. The television film was based more around modeling than the fashion industry, and featured Joan Hackett, Jennifer Warren, Joan Collins, Daryl Hannah, and Alexandra Paul in the roles that were taken by Fairchild, Sheridan, and Farrell in the series (Warren and Jeffrey Richman were the only two actors to appear in both the television film and the 1984 series). The film's theme song was "Paper Doll", written by Mark Snow and performed by Brock Walsh.

1984 television series

In 1984, MGM decided to produce a weekly series based on the television film for ABC, recasting several of the original roles from the 1982 production. Racine (Morgan Fairchild) was the owner of a prestigious Manhattan modeling agency, and was frequently at odds with Grant Harper (Lloyd Bridges), who helmed the board of Harper Cosmetics, a division of his family's corporation, Harper WorldWide Incorporated. Grant was well-meaning, but he could be relentless and stubborn in getting his own way with business and his family. Playing both sides was Grant's son Wesley (Dack Rambo), who craved more power in the family business and allied himself romantically with Racine. (Wesley also resented his father, whom he blamed for the accidental death of his mother, Grant's first wife, Virginia.) Grant was then married to his second wife, Marjorie (Nancy Olson).

Wesley's half-sister, Blair Harper Fenton (Mimi Rogers; Marjorie was her mother) was a supermodel, (in fact, she was Racine's first client when she opened her modeling agency, and she was also considered a good friend of Racine's) who was fearing her career was on the downslide now that she was 30 years old and pregnant. Despite health problems, Blair was determined to carry her baby to full term. Grant tended to fawn over Blair a lot. Blair's husband David Fenton (Richard Beymer) was a sportswear designer (he owned Tempus Sportswear). David and Wesley were at odds because of the former marrying his half-sister. Unfortunately, because David was too proud to accept financial assistance from his in-laws, the Harpers, his business partner had to resort to accepting money from loan sharks to fund his upcoming collection, which put David and Blair in serious danger.  Eventually, David did ask his father in-law for help, the results of which brought Tempus under the Harper WorldWide banner, paid off the loan in full, and also the interest.

Racine was also at odds with Taryn Blake (Nicollette Sheridan), the top teen model in the business, who was proving to be a liability due to unprofessional behavior, problems with drugs and alcohol, and a sensationalized romance with 1980s pop star John Waite (playing himself for several episodes). To keep Taryn and her demanding mother/manager Julia (Brenda Vaccaro) in line, Racine decided to promote a new fresh teen face, a young woman named Laurie Caswell (Terry Farrell).

The naive and innocent Laurie was not prepared for the fast success, despite her mother Dinah Anderson Caswell's (Jennifer Warren) best efforts to keep her grounded. Dinah, a former model herself, and having had previous modeling experience, spent time on her daughter's career that in turn started causing problems in her marriage to Michael Caswell (John Bennett Perry), who was Laurie's stepfather. Michael disagreed with Laurie being a model; while Dinah saw it as a rewarding experience for Laurie, which would help her build up her low self-esteem, it also reminded her of her own days as a model.

Despite their vast differences, Taryn and Laurie became good friends. Laurie attended public school in her hometown, Stonehurst, on Long Island, despite her being a model. Taryn wished that Dinah, who was much more compassionate than the overbearing Julia, was her mother. Vindictive and mean-spirited Julia merely saw her daughter as a meal ticket, and Taryn, who only wanted to be a normal teenager, clearly resented that. Because of this, mother and daughter clashed repeatedly. Julia, who was also very greedy, also dreaded the day that Taryn would turn 17, because then her daughter would be considered legal age as a model and the money would go directly to her and not to her mother.  Julia and Dinah would also become rivals because of Taryn and Laurie being models.

Because her life as a successful model was severely regimented by Julia, Taryn, who had been a model ever since she was a small child, was very lonely and she was not often allowed to socialize with other people her age. Because of this, Taryn saw Laurie as the only real friend she had, and she offered to teach her all she knew about the world of modeling and fashion.  Laurie not only had to deal with the pressures of the world of modeling, but as she was still in public school, she had to also contend with the regular  trials of teenaged  friends and high school grades.

Mark Bailey (Roscoe Born), a reporter doing a story on the fashion industry, became enamored with Racine, causing problems in his relationship with sensible lawyer Sara Frank (Anne Schedeen), who was Blair's best friend. A suspicious Sara cautioned her boyfriend on becoming too interested in Racine, commenting, "She's been in more beds than a hotel breakfast tray!"  She still admired Racine's success, by commenting, "She's done well for a girl named off of a map of Wisconsin."

Reception
The series attempted to ride the wave of popular glossy nighttime soaps, such as Dallas and Dynasty. When Paper Dolls premiered in September 1984, the first episode achieved an 18.4 rating. It featured the requisite stock pleasures such as big business, glamour, intrigue, catfights, and verbal spats (particularly between Racine and most of the other characters). In one scene, Mark entered Racine's office while she was getting a massage. He asked, "Do you want me to wait outside until you're decent?" Racine responded, "How much time do you have?" In another scene, an irate Julia, brandishing a Barbie-style fashion doll of her daughter, stormed into Racine's office. "This will not be the new Taryn Blake doll!" she barked. "The eyes are brown!" Coolly, Racine quipped, "I guess they couldn't quite match that bloodshot tone."

Even with a series of rave reviews in People  urging viewers to give the show a chance, ratings were low and the series was not able to find an audience,  due in large part because the show had been pre-empted on some weeks by the baseball playoffs. The final episode of the series found David on the verge of failure after an influential fashion critic was blackmailed by Wesley and Racine to pan his new sportswear collection; Grant's wife Marjorie (Nancy Olson) was feared dead in a plane crash; and Racine received a call from Mark intimating that his digging into her secretive past had uncovered something very interesting. The cliffhangers were left unresolved.

Cast and characters

Main
Lloyd Bridges as Grant Harper
Jennifer Warren as Dinah Caswell
Brenda Vaccaro as Julia Blake
Dack Rambo as Wesley Harper
Mimi Rogers as Blair Harper Fenton
Richard Beymer as David Fenton
Anne Schedeen as Sara Frank
John Bennett Perry as Michael Caswell
Nancy Olson as Marjorie Harper
Nicollette Sheridan as Taryn Blake
Terry Farrell as Laurie Caswell
Lauren Hutton as Colette Ferrier
Morgan Fairchild as Racine

Supporting
Roscoe Born as Mark Bailey
Don Bowren as Christopher York
Jonathan Frakes as Sandy Paris
John Reilly as Jake Larner
Larry Linville as Grayson Carr
Thom Mathews as Lewis Crosby
Alan Fudge as Dr. Van Adams
Jeffrey Richman as Conrad
Jordan Christopher as Oliver
Sue Giosa as Marie
Mark Schneider as Sammy
John Waite as himself

Syndication and international broadcast
Reruns of the series have been shown on the SOAPnet cable channel in the United States. The series was also shown in the United Kingdom by the ITV network in the mid-1980s, though schedules varied per region. It was also shown in Italy on Canale 5 under the name Il profumo del successo (The Taste of Success), and in Germany under the title Karussell der Puppen (Doll Carousel). In South America and Spain, it was broadcast as Muñecas de Papel. In Sweden it was broadcast 1986 on TV2 under the name Modedockorna (The Fashion Dolls).

References

External links
  (1982 television film)
  (1984 series)

1984 American television series debuts
1984 American television series endings
American Broadcasting Company original programming
American primetime television soap operas
American television soap operas
English-language television shows
Modeling-themed television series
Television series by MGM Television
Television shows set in Los Angeles
Television shows set in New York City